Slobodan Petrovski (born 11 February 1970) is a Macedonian former professional basketball player who played for MZT Skopje, Žito Vardar, Nikol Fert and Vardar. He was also member of Macedonia national basketball team. Petrovski`s coaching career started in 2009 when he was appointed as head coach of Vardar Osiguruvanje.

His son Luka Petrovski is also a basketball player. He is a member of Rabotnički

References

External links
 
  
 

1970 births
Living people
Macedonian men's basketball players
Sportspeople from Skopje
KK MZT Skopje players
Small forwards